James Peale (1749 – May 24, 1831) was an American painter, best known for his miniature and still life paintings, and a younger brother of noted painter Charles Willson Peale.

Early life

Peale was born in Chestertown, Maryland, the second child, after Charles, of Charles Peale (1709–1750) and Margaret Triggs (1709–1791). His father died when he was an infant, and the family moved to Annapolis.

In 1762, he began to serve apprenticeships there, first in a saddlery and later in a cabinetmaking shop. After his brother Charles returned from London in 1769, where he had studied with Benjamin West, Peale served as his assistant and learned how to paint.

Career

Peale worked in his brother's studio until January 14, 1776, when he accepted a commission in the Continental Army as an ensign in William Smallwood's regiment.  Within three months he was promoted to captain, and during the next three years fought in the battles of Long Island, White Plains, Trenton, Brandywine, Germantown, Princeton, and Monmouth. He resigned his army commission in 1779, and moved to Philadelphia to live with his brother. (One notable later collaboration, however, was in 1788 to make floats for Philadelphia's Federal Procession in honor of the newly drafted United States Constitution).

At the conclusion of the Revolutionary War Peale was admitted as an original member of The Society of the Cincinnati of Maryland when it was established in 1783.

At the outset of his painting career Peale painted portraits and still-life, and by the mid-1780s had established his reputation. At about this time, however, Charles turned over his own miniature portrait practice to him, and throughout the 1790s and early 19th century Peale devoted himself to miniature painting. Much of this work was watercolor on ivory. In 1795 Peale exhibited a still life of fruit along with nine miniatures and his family portrait at the Columbianum, a short-lived art academy in Philadelphia. Around 1810, as Peale's eyesight began to weaken, he gave up painting miniatures to turn to large portraits and still-life subjects that were greatly admired and widely exhibited in Philadelphia, Boston, and Baltimore.

The total number of Peale's landscape paintings remains unknown, but he executed more than 200 watercolor miniatures on ivory, perhaps 100 still-life paintings, fewer than 70 oil portraits, and at least 8 history paintings.

Personal life

In 1782 he married Mary Claypoole (1753-1828), a daughter of James Claypoole and sister of portrait painter James Claypoole Jr., after which he established his own household and artistic career. Together, Mary and James were the parents of seven children, three of whom became accomplished painters in their own right, including:

 Maria Claypoole Peale (1787–1866) also became a painter of still lifes, though of less distinction than her sisters.
 James Peale Jr. (1789–1876), who married his cousin, Sophonisba Peale (1801–1878), daughter of Raphaelle Peale.
 Anna Claypoole Peale (1791–1878), a miniaturist and still-life painter
 Margaretta Angelica Peale (1796–1882), painter of trompe l’oeil subjects and tabletop fruit
 Sarah Miriam Peale (1800–1885), a portraitist and still-life painter
 Jane Ramsay Peale
 Eleanor Peale.

Peale died in Philadelphia on May 24, 1831 and is buried at Gloria Dei (Old Swedes') Church cemetery along with this wife and six children.

Gallery

References

External links

American paintings & historical prints from the Middendorf collection, an exhibition catalog from The Metropolitan Museum of Art (fully available online as PDF), which contains material on Peale (no. 6)
Union List of Artist Names, Getty Vocabularies. ULAN Full Record Display for James Peale, Sr. Getty Vocabulary Program, Getty Research Institute. Los Angeles, California.
 The Society of the Cincinnati
 The American Revolution Institute

1749 births
1831 deaths
18th-century American painters
18th-century American male artists
American male painters
19th-century American painters
19th-century American male artists
Continental Army officers from Maryland
James
Sibling artists
People from Chestertown, Maryland
Painters from Maryland
People of colonial Maryland
Burials at Gloria Dei (Old Swedes') Church